Prof. Govind J. Chakrapani is an Indian geologist and the current Vice Chancellor of Berhampur University in Odisha, India. He has been a professor in the Department of Earth Sciences at IIT Roorkee since 2008. He was the Dean at the School of Ecology & Environment Studies and the Officiating Dean at the School of Buddhist Studies, Nalanda University from 2017-18.

Early life and education 

Prof. Chakrapani went to school in Odisha. He received his B.Sc. in Geology with Honours from Berhampur University in 1983, M.Sc. in Applied Geology from IIT Bombay and a PhD in Environmental Geochemistry from Jawaharlal Nehru University, Delhi.

Career 

Following the completion of his PhD, he served as a Research Scientist at the Hudson River Foundation at the University of Delaware and a CSIR Pool Officer at JNU and IIT Bombay before joining the faculty at the erstwhile University of Roorkee (converted to Indian Institute of Technology in 2001) in 1996. In addition to his research and academic responsibilities, Prof. Chakrapani served as the Dean of the School of Ecology & Environment Studies and the Officiating Dean at the School of Buddhist Studies, Nalanda University from 2017-18. He also served as the Finance Officer-In-Charge and as the Director of the Unnat Bharat Abhiyan during his time there. He was the Organizing Chairman of GATE in 2017, Chairman of GATE in 2015, 2016 and 2017, and Chairman of JAM in 2015, 2016 and 2017. From October 2019, he has served as the Vice Chancellor of Berhampur University in Odisha.

He has also been associated with numerous advisory and expert committees of Government of India,  such as Chairman of Uttarakhand State Environment Expert Appraisal Committee, Member of State Environmental Impact Assessment Authority, Member of River Valley and Hydropower Projects, Accreditatation Member of Quality Council of India etc.

Research 

His research interests include low-temperature geochemistry, environment of rivers & lakes, urban hydrogeology, rock-water-air interaction, environmental impact assessment & management. He has published studies related to environmental processes in rivers and their organic geochemistry in lakes and urban hydrogeology. His research group exploited the use of neural network techniques in geology for application in Indian river systems for the prediction of river sediment loads effectively. These studies on Himalayan rivers established the significant role of Himalayan catchment and seasonal variations for large scale changes in chemical weathering rates. In a first ever study in India, laboratory experiments were carried out to understand the dissolution rates of rocks/minerals in simulated conditions, which assume significance for the release of trace elements from rocks/minerals, triggering of landslides, suitable repositories for nuclear waste disposal etc. In a significant study, impact of Deccan Traps erosion on the global climate was estimated and validated. Other significant research includes studies on the daily and 
decadal variations and factors controlling dissolved and sediment flux by the Narmada and the Mahanadi rivers that showed the precise water discharge and sediment flux to the Arabian Sea and Bay of Bengal respectively.

Honours 

In recognition of his academic contributions, he was rated a Star Performer at IIT Roorkee in 2003-04 and 2005-06 along with being felicitated for bringing laurels to the Institute in 2017. He was awarded the National Geosciences (Mineral) Award by the Government of India in 2005). He was elected Fellow of the National Academy of Sciences in India (FNASc) in 2012.

References 

Indian academic administrators
Year of birth missing (living people)
Living people